Norbert Hofmann (born 3 June 1963) is a German former sports shooter. He competed in the mixed skeet event at the 1984 Summer Olympics.

References

External links
 

1963 births
Living people
German male sport shooters
Olympic shooters of West Germany
Shooters at the 1984 Summer Olympics
People from Worms, Germany
Sportspeople from Rhineland-Palatinate